Jean-Maurice Ripert (born 22 June 1953) is a French diplomat. From 2013 to 2017 was the Ambassador of France to the Russian Federation. He is the current ambassador of France to China.

From 2009 to 2011, Ripert was the UN's Special Envoy for Assistance to Pakistan. Prior to this, from 2007 to 2009, Ripert was the Permanent Representative of France to the United Nations in New York. In that capacity, he was the President of the United Nations Security Council in September 2007 and in January 2009. Ripert was France's Permanent Representative to the United Nations in Geneva from 2005 to 2007.

Ripert was France's ambassador to Greece from 2000 to 2003.

In 2011, he was selected for the role of  Ambassador of the European Union to Turkey, followed by his present position.

References
"Secretary-General Appoints Jean-Maurice Ripert of France as Special Envoy for Assistance to Pakistan", 2009-08-24, UN Doc SG/A/1197 BIO/4108*

1953 births
Living people
Chevaliers of the Légion d'honneur
Ambassadors of France to Russia
Ambassadors of the European Union to Turkey
Ambassadors of France to Greece
Sciences Po alumni
École nationale d'administration alumni
Permanent Representatives of France to the United Nations
French officials of the United Nations
Special Envoys of the Secretary-General of the United Nations